Indiana elected its members August 4, 1828, swapping a Jacksonian and Anti-Jacksonian but retaining its 2-1 Anti-Jacksonian majority.

See also 
 1828 and 1829 United States House of Representatives elections
 List of United States representatives from Indiana

1828
Indiana
United States House of Representatives